Beryozovsky District is an administrative and municipal district (raion), one of the nine in Khanty-Mansi Autonomous Okrug of Tyumen Oblast, Russia. It is located in the northwest of the autonomous okrug on the left bank of meridional part of the Ob River within the limits of North Sosva altitudes and the east slope of the North and Pre-Polar Ural and borders with the Komi Republic in the west and with Shuryshkarsky District of Yamalo-Nenets Autonomous Okrug in the north. Its administrative center is the urban locality (an urban-type settlement) of Beryozovo. Population: 25,744 (2010 Census);  The population of Beryozovo accounts for 28.3% of the district's total population.

Geography
The district lies in the basins of the Lesser Ob and the Severnaya Sosva Rivers.

Climate
The climate of the district is extremely cold, characterized by the way in which weather conditions are able to rapidly change. Temperatures are below freezing for seven months of the year—from October to April. Snow lies on the ground for 180 to 200 days—again, from October to the start of May. The warmest month is July, when average temperatures reach .

Demographics
The population is multiethnic, with prevalence of Russian, Ukrainian, and Tatar ethnicities. The district is a place of dense habitation of the Mansi people (est. 6,117 people). Indigenous (Khanty, Mansi, and Nenets) make up approximately 25% of the district's population.

References

Notes

Sources

Districts of Khanty-Mansi Autonomous Okrug